Dylan Cretin (Born 4 May 1997) is a French rugby union player. His usual position is as a Flanker, and he currently plays for Lyon OU in the Top 14. In January 2020, Cretin was called into the French squad for the 2020 Six Nations Championship.

International career

International tries

Honours

International 
 France
Six Nations Championship: 2022
Grand Slam: 2022

References

External links
France profile at FFR
Lyon OU profile
ESPN Profile

1997 births
Living people
People from Annemasse
Lyon OU players
Rugby union flankers
French rugby union players
France international rugby union players
Sportspeople from Haute-Savoie